Nida Airfield  is a small regional airfield, opened in 1967, located in Nida, in the western part of Lithuania, near the Baltic Sea and Klaipėda. It was one of the first aerodromes in western Lithuania.

The airport's infrastructure allows it to handle medium and small sized aircraft, such as the Saab 2000 and Saab 340.

In 1998-2006 the runway surface, apron and taxiways were renovated (5 million LTL from the government of Lithuania). However, works were not finished yet, vicinity falling short of standards and aerodrome was closed for all traffic except helicopters.

After finally finishing the reconstruction, the airport has been officially reopened on June 18, 2016 for light airplanes (seating capacity up to four), gliders and helicopters. At that date the airport had no refueling facilities and was formally just an "airstrip" with the assigned code A 129 and ICAO EYND (Coordinates 55°19'40"N 21°2'45"E, 6 ft/2 m AMSL elevation, runway direction 08/26 and 815 m/2,674 ft asphalt).

Airport classified as certified aerodrome at July 3, 2020 per NOTAM B0038/20 with new ICAO identifier EYNI and runway designator 07/25 (direction 73/253 deg mag) with dimensions 500 x 30 m (strip: 560 x 60 m, MTOM 5,700 kg) and call sign NIDA RADIO on ch 128.705.

Destinations 
Airline:
Nida-Vilnius-Nida (1970–1975),
Nida-Palanga-Nida (1970–1975),
Nida-Kaunas-Nida (1970–1975),
Charter flights.

See also 
Palanga International Airport
Klaipėda Airport

References

External links 
History of Nida Airport 
About Renovation of Nida Airport 

Airports in Lithuania
Buildings and structures in Klaipėda County